Ahir Hemant Khava is an Indian politician. He is serving as a Member of the Gujarat Legislative Assembly from the Jamjodhpur Assembly constituency representing the Aam Aadmi Party since 8 December 2022.

In January 2023, he was appointed as the Deputy Legislative party leader of AAP in the Gujarat assembly.

References 

Living people
Aam Aadmi Party politicians
Gujarat MLAs 2022–2027
Year of birth missing (living people)